Great Burstead and South Green is a civil parish in the Basildon district, in the county of Essex, England. The parish includes the settlements of Great Burstead, Noak Hill and South Green. In 2011 the parish had a population of 5968. The parish touches Billericay, Little Burstead, Noak Bridge and Ramsden Crays. There are 14 listed buildings in Great Burstead and South Green.

History 
The parish was formed on 1 September 1996 from part of the unparished area of Basildon.

References

External links 
 

Civil parishes in Essex
Borough of Basildon